Ola Selvaag Solbakken (born 7 September 1998) is a Norwegian professional footballer who plays as a winger for Serie A club Roma and the Norway national team.

Club career

Bodø/Glimt
After starting his career at Ranheim, Solbakken signed a two-year contract with Bodø/Glimt on 18 December 2019, joining the club on 1 January 2020.

Roma
On 23 November 2022, Serie A club Roma announced to have signed Solbakken as a free agent, agreeing a contract until 30 June 2027. As being under contract with Bodø/Glimt until the end of the year, he joined Roma on 2 January 2023.

International career
Solbakken made his debut for Norway national team on 13 November 2021 in a World Cup qualifier against Latvia.

Career statistics

Club

Honours
Bodø/Glimt
Eliteserien: 2020, 2021

References

1998 births
Living people
People from Melhus
Sportspeople from Trøndelag
Norwegian footballers
Association football wingers
Norway international footballers
Norway youth international footballers
Eliteserien players
Serie A players
Ranheim Fotball players
FK Bodø/Glimt players
A.S. Roma players
Norwegian expatriate footballers
Norwegian expatriate sportspeople in Italy
Expatriate footballers in Italy